Metatrichoniscoides fouresi is a species of woodlouse in the family Trichoniscidae that is found in France.

References

Woodlice
Crustaceans described in 1950
Woodlice of Europe